Carrascosa de Haro is a municipality in Cuenca, Castile-La Mancha, Spain. It has a population of 146.

References 

Municipalities in the Province of Cuenca